Erotic lactation is sexual arousal by breastfeeding on a woman's breast. Depending on the context, the practice can also be referred to as adult suckling, adult nursing, and adult breastfeeding. Practitioners sometimes refer to themselves as being in an adult nursing relationship (ANR). Two persons in an exclusive relationship can be called a nursing couple.

"Milk fetishism" and "lactophilia" are medical, diagnostic terms for paraphilias and are used for disorders according to the precise criteria of ICD-10 and DSM-IV.

Physiology 
Breasts, and especially nipples, are highly erogenous zones, for both men and women. Nipple and breast stimulation of women are a near-universal aspect of human sexuality, though nipples in males are not as sexualized. Humans are the only primates whose female members have permanently enlarged breasts after the onset of puberty; the breasts of other primate species are enlarged only during pregnancy and nursing. One hypothesis postulates that the breasts grew as a frontal counterpart to the buttocks as primates became upright to attracting mates, a model first developed in 1967. Other hypotheses include that by chance breasts act as a cushion for infant heads, are a signal of fertility, or elevate the infant's head in breastfeeding to prevent suffocation. Paradoxically, there is even a school that believes that they are an evolutionary flaw, and can actually suffocate a nursing infant.
The association of pleasure and nutrition holds true as well for the lips, also erogenous zones, where pleasure may have led to "kiss feeding", in which mothers chew food before passing it on to the child.

Unintended milk flow (galactorrhea) is often caused by nipple stimulation and it is possible to reach normal milk production exclusively by suckling on the breast. Nipple stimulation of any sort is noted in reducing the incidence of breast cancer.

Some women lose the ability to be aroused while breastfeeding, and thus would not find lactation with a sexual partner to be erotic. This can be a result of physical reasons (soreness) or psychological reasons (conflicted about her breasts being used other than for an infant).

Motivations 
Because female breasts and nipples are generally regarded as an important part of sexual activity in most cultures,  it is not uncommon that couples may proceed from oral stimulation of the nipples to actual breastfeeding. In its issue of March 13, 2005, the London weekly newspaper The Sunday Times gave a report of a scientific survey (composed of 1690 British men) Indicating that in 25 to 33% of all couples, the male partner had suckled his wife's breasts. Regularly, the men gave a genuine emotional need as their motive. In lesbian partnerships, mutual breastfeeding has been regarded as a familiar expression of affection and tenderness.

In heterosexual couples, erotic lactation is sometimes seen as a kink. Men in such relationships can become sexually aroused by seeing a woman lactate, having sex with a lactating woman or sucking on her breasts.

Social implications 
The breasts have two main roles in human society: nutritive and sexual. Breastfeeding in general is considered by some to be a mild form of exhibitionism, especially in Western societies (see breastfeeding in public). Breastfeeding mothers have faced legal ramifications for nursing their children into toddler-hood or in public, or for photographing themselves while nursing.

Researcher Nikki Sullivan, in her book A Critical Introduction to Queer Theory, calls erotic lactation a manifestation of "Queer." She defines Queer as an ideology; that is, as a "sort of vague and indefinable set of practices and (political) positions that has the potential to challenge normative knowledges and identities." Drawing on a statement of David Halperin, she continues "since queer is a positionality rather than an identity in the humanist sense, it is not restricted to gays and lesbians but can be taken up by anyone who feels marginalized as a result of their sexual practices." The hetero-normative profile of breastfeeding assumes certain norms:
an infant up to twelve months old;
motivations of nutritional and developmental benefits for the child and physiological benefits for the mother;
possible secondary motivations of convenience and cheapness;
practice in private, domestic settings; and
breast milk-consumption exclusivity to the youngest infant
Additionally, any relevant third party is assumed to be the mother's significant other and this person is relegated to a supportive role to maximize the breastfeeding mother's success.

Varieties 
Various methods are employed to practice erotic lactation. They are listed according to prevalence, in decreasing order:

Lactation games 
Lactation games include any kind of sexual activity which includes a woman's breast milk. Such activity is widespread, and often unintentional, in the time after a woman gives birth, since many women experience a let-down reflex (releasing milk) when sexually aroused.

Lactation pornography 
While lactation does appear in pornography, it is a specialty niche and is considered taboo by many because of its proximity to incest and children. Most breast representations are without milk, and abound in the media in an erotic way both in and out of pornography.

Adult nursing relationship 
An adult nursing relationship (ANR) involves the suckling of milk from a woman's breast on a regular basis from one or more partner(s). Successful ANRs depend on a stable and long-term relationship, as otherwise it is very difficult to maintain a steady milk flow. Couples may begin an ANR by transferring regular suckling from a child to a sexual partner (e.g. spouse). Such a relationship may form as an expression of close intimacy and mutual tenderness, and may even exist without sex. Breastfeeding can have a strong stabilizing effect on the partnership. The breastfeeding woman may experience orgasms or a pleasurable let-down reflex.

ANRs have also been employed in cases where a mother may desire to breastfeed her child, but has to find an alternative to inducing lactation. She may have difficulty beginning lactation, so she supplements the infant's suckling with that of a partner. Or there are cases where breastfeeding was interrupted for an extended period of time as a result of infant prematurity, infant absence, or mother's illness (taking prescription medication). In such cases, adult nursing has often caused lactation to continue until it was possible for the child to resume breastfeeding. Others may want to nurse an adopted child, so use an ANR to stimulate breast milk production before the adoption occurs. Though such scenarios do not have erotic motivations, erotic expression may be an additional aspect of the relationship.

Pumping 
Some women experience sensual pleasure from using a breast pump to extract milk from their breasts or from expressing milk manually—with or without a partner. In addition to the sensual pleasure, women have reported feeling more feminine while producing milk and continue with lactation for emotional or sensual reasons after weaning a baby.

Lactation prostitution 
This is the act of breastfeeding adults for pay (not to be confused with breastfeeding infants or babies for pay, i.e. wet nursing). In 2003, there was a report of Chinese brothel that offered lactation services to its clients.

Infantilism 
As a part of the sexual fetish of infantilism, the non-lactating partner assumes the role of a baby in sexual role-play. Breastfeeding might play a secondary role in this type of relationship; and being pampered by "mommy", wearing diapers, or a hidden incestuous character may be the predominant motivation in this kind of relationship.

Lactation, re-lactation and induced lactation 
Erotic lactation between partners or an adult nursing relationship may develop from natural breastfeeding of a baby. During the lactation period the partner starts to suckle on the female breast, and continues after the baby is weaned off. Milk production is continually stimulated and the milk flow continues. According to the book Body parts: critical explorations in corporeality, adult nursing may occur when an "individual, usually a mother, may choose to continue lactating after weaning a child, so that she avoids the significant physical challenge that inducing lactation can entail."

However, milk production can be "artificially" and intentionally induced in the absence of any pregnancy in the woman. This is called induced lactation, while a woman who has lactated before and restarts is said to relactate. This can be done by regularly sucking on the nipples (several times a day), massaging and squeezing the female breasts, or with additional help from temporary use of milk-inducing drugs, such as the dopamine antagonist Domperidone. In principle—with considerable patience and perseverance—it is possible to induce lactation by sucking on the nipples alone.

It is not necessary that the woman has ever been pregnant, and she can be well in her post-menopausal period. Once established, lactation adjusts to demand. As long as there is regular breast stimulation, lactation is possible.

Adult lactation historically and culturally 

Though birth is the beginning of the separation between mother and child, breastfeeding slows this process, making the mother and infant connect physically continually, sometimes for years. As a source of nourishment, the immediacy of this connection is intensified. Breastfeeding has a sexual element as a result of physiological factors. In a study conducted in 1999, approximately 33 to 50 percent of mothers found breast feeding erotic, and among them 25 percent felt guilty because of this. This study corroborated a study in 1949 that found that in a few cases where the arousal was strong enough to induce orgasm, some nursing mothers abandoned breastfeeding altogether. In a 1988 questionnaire on orgasm and pregnancy published in a Dutch magazine for women, when asked "Did you experience, while breastfeeding, a sensation of sexual excitement?", 34 percent (or 153 total) answered in the affirmative. An additional 71 percent answered in the affirmative when asked "Did you experience, while breastfeeding, pleasurable contractions in the uterine region".

Adult lactation in history 

Since the European Middle Ages, a multitude of subliminally erotic, visionary experiences of saints have been passed on in which breastfeeding plays a major role. One prominent example is the Lactatio of Saint Bernard of Clairvaux.

Roman Charity 

Roman Charity (or Caritas Romana) is a story of a woman, Pero, who secretly breastfeeds her father, Cimon, after he is incarcerated and sentenced to death by starvation. She is found out by a jailer, but her act of selflessness impresses officials and wins her father's release. The story comes from the Roman writer Valerius Maximus in the years AD 14–AD 37. In about AD 1362 the story was retold by the famous writer Giovanni Boccaccio. After Boccaccio, hundreds or possibly thousands of paintings were created, which tell the story. A variant of this story can be found at the conclusion of John Steinbeck's 1939 novel The Grapes of Wrath. Primarily, the story tells of a conflict. An existing taboo (implied incest and adult breastfeeding of a woman's milk) or saving a life by breaking the taboo. In this aspect there is no erotic focus to the story.

Valerius Maximus tells another story about a woman breastfeeding her mother, which is followed by the very short story of a woman breastfeeding her father. The second, father-daughter story in fact consists of one sentence only. Thirteen hundred years later, Boccaccio retells the (first) mother-daughter story, and does not mention the father-daughter story, and the first is apparently forgotten, leading to nearly all "caritas romana" oil paintings and drawings showing only the father-daughter story.

Pre-industrial England 
Adult suckling was used to treat ailing adults and treat illnesses including eye disease and pulmonary tuberculosis. The writer Thomas Moffat recorded one physician's use of a wet nurse in a tome first published in 1655.

Islamic law 
In traditional Islamic law, a child under the age of two (besides many strict rules like that the suckling should be of such quantity that it could be said that the bones of the child were strengthened and the flesh allowed to grow. And if that cannot be ascertained, then if a child suckles for one full day and night, or if it suckles fifteen times to its fill, it will be sufficient), is that woman's child through a foster relationship (the woman is then called "milk mother"). However, according to the Jurist Abu's-Su`ud (c.1490–1574), this only applies to sucklings under the age of two and a half years. Also, according to Ayatollah Ali Sistani, a highly praised scholar for the Shia Muslims: "The child should not have completed two years of his age". The same latter source states at least eight conditions that should apply before that child is considered a son/daughter of the feeding woman. (This is not considered to be an adoption, which is strictly proscribed by the Qu'ran.) A modern Saudi Jurist, in 1983, upheld that if a man suckles from his wife, their marriage is nullified. The query remains a popular one into the 21st century, and has come up in Saudi advice columns. A Sunni cleric Sheik Ezzat Atiya (عزت عطية), President of the Hadith Department of Egypt's al-Azhar University issued a fatwa in 2007 encouraging women to breastfeed their male business colleagues so that the man could become symbolically related to the woman, thereby precluding any sexual relations and the need for both sexes to observe modesty. "Breast feeding an adult puts an end to the problem of the private meeting." It was later denounced and declared defamatory to Islam.

China 
A Beijing restaurant offered breast-milk-based dishes on its menu. In China, many websites routinely advertise membership to breastfeeding club where customers can get access to lactating women who they can pay to suckle from their breasts.

In 2013 a domestic staff agency in China named Xinxinyu was reported to be providing wet nurses for the sick and other adults as well as for newborns. The agency's clients could choose to drink the breast milk directly from the breast or to drink it via a breast pump. The reports caused controversy in China, with one writer describing it as "adding to China's problem of treating women as consumer goods and the moral degradation of China's rich." The agency was forced to suspend its operations by Chinese authorities for a number of reasons, one of which was for missing three years of annual checks.

Germany 
In 1903, German philosopher Carl Buttenstedt published his marriage guidebook "Die Glücksehe – Die Offenbarung im Weibe, eine Naturstudie" (The Marriage of Happiness – The Revelation in the Woman, a study from nature), in which he described and recommended the lactational amenorrhea method (LAM) as a form of contraception and natural family planning that also deepens the relationship between wife and husband. He explicitly described erotic lactation as a source of great sexual pleasure for both partners, claiming that this is intended by nature especially on the part of the woman. This particular aspect of his broader general marriage philosophy gained a lot of attention and sparked wide debate. While some welcomed Buttenstedt's advice as inspirational for new ways to improve sexual satisfaction between marriage partners, others warned that this technique could "pathologically increase sexual sensation of both partners." Consequently, the book was banned by the Nazis in 1938.

Japan
The Bonyu Bar (Mother’s Milk Bar), located in Tokyo’s entertainment and red-light district of Kabukicho, employs nursing women who provide customers with breast milk in a glass for 2,000 yen (about 15 euros) or directly from the nipple for 5000 yen (about 37.50 euros). In the latter case the women can run their fingers through the customers' hair, coo and say their name as they suckle.

See also 

 Lactation
 Mammary intercourse
 Breast fetishism
 Stimulation of nipples
 Rada (fiqh), Islamic jurisprudence related to wetnursing, sometimes extended to adults
 Sexual fetishism

Notes

Footnotes

References 
 Abdella Doumato, Eleanor (2000). "Getting God's Ear: Women, Islam, and Healing in Saudi Arabia and the Gulf". Columbia University Press 
 Boswell-Penc, Maia (2006). Tainted Milk: Breastmilk, Feminisms, And the Politics of Environmental Degradation. SUNY Press 
 Budin, Pierre (1907). Translated by William Joseph; Marie Alois Maloney. The Nursling: The Feeding and Hygiene of Premature and Full-term Infants Caxton, 48.
 Elhadj, Elie (2006). "The Islamic Shield: Arab Resistance to Democratic and Religious Reforms". Universal Publishers 
 Forth, Christopher E.; Crozier, Ivan (2005) Body parts: critical explorations in corporeality. Lanham, Maryland. Lexington Books. ppp. 133–136. 
 Harrison, Helen; Kositsky, Ann (1983). The Premature Baby Book: A Parents Guide to Coping and Caring in the First Years. St. Martin's Press p. 158. 
 Imber, Colin (1997). "Islamic law". Edinburgh University Press 
 Prior, Mary (1991). Women in English Society, 1500–1800. Routledge, 6.

Further reading 
 Lundell, T. Louisa, PhD (2006). The Lore and Lure of Mother's Milk. Trafford Publishing, 19–24. 

Oral eroticism
Paraphilias
Sexual fetishism
Sexual acts
Sexology
Breast